大麻煩 (py. Dà Máfán, en. Big Trouble) is an album by Taiwanese singer/actress/model Vivian Hsu, released April 29, 1998 on the BMG label. Though Vivian's third solo album, it is her first solo Chinese-language album, despite that language being her mother tongue.

Track listing
 大麻煩 (py. Dà Máfán, en. Big Trouble) – 5:00
 COOL – 4:29
 台北下了雪 (py. Táiběi Xiàle Xǔe, en. Snow in Taipei) – 5:23
 我很Blue (py. Wō Hěn Blue, en. I'm So Blue) – 4:28
 用可樂乾杯 (py. Yòkě Lè Gānbēi) – 5:11
 いいよ (好哎!) (Ii yo!, py. Hǎo āi!, en. Good!) – 4:45
 紅酒 (py. Hóng Jiǔ, en. Red Wine) – 4:30
 凹凸 (py. Āotū, en. Bumpy) – 4:37
 HAPPY ENDING – 4:14
 大麻煩 Re-Mix Version – 5:34

Release details

Vivian Hsu albums
1998 albums
Mandarin-language albums